Luis García Martínez (born 20 August 1941), commonly known as Luiche, is a Spanish football manager and former player who played as a right back.

Football career
Born in Alicante but raised in Villena, both in the Valencian Community, Luiche's professional inputs as a player consisted of 11 Segunda División matches with CF Calvo Sotelo in the 1965–66 season. During his playing career, he also represented Villena CF (two stints), CD Monóvar, UD Oliva, SD Ibiza, CD Eldense, Villarreal CF and CD Benicarló before retiring in 1974 at the age of 32.

Immediately after retiring Luiche took up coaching, being in charge of local side UD Petrelense. After managing Santa Pola CF and AP Almansa, he first arrived in Segunda División B, in charge of a club he represented as a player, Eldense.

In 1986, after spells at Albacete Balompié, Almansa, CD Alcoyano and CF Nules, Luiche was appointed manager of Villarreal in Tercera División. After achieving promotion with the latter in his first season and narrowly missing out promotion in his second, he took over CD Castellón in the second division.

Luiche achieved promotion to La Liga with Castellón in 1989, and remained in charge of the club until April 1991; despite being replaced by Lucien Muller, the club still suffered relegation at the end of the campaign. In June 1991, he was named manager of CE Sabadell FC in the second level, but was sacked in October after only one win in six matches.

Luiche then worked at Cartagena FC before returning to Castellón in February 1994, but being unable to avoid the club's relegation from the second division. After suffering another drop at Alcoyano in 1995–96, he subsequently managed Novelda CF also in division three.

In May 2012, the city of Villena named their new stadium after Luiche.

Honours

Manager
Castellón
Segunda División: 1988–89

References

External links

1941 births
Living people
People from Alicante
Spanish footballers
Footballers from the Valencian Community
Association football defenders
Segunda División players
Tercera División players
CD Puertollano footballers
CD Eldense footballers
Villarreal CF players
Spanish football managers
La Liga managers
Segunda División managers
Segunda División B managers
Tercera División managers
CD Eldense managers
Albacete Balompié managers
CD Alcoyano managers
Villarreal CF managers
CD Castellón managers
CE Sabadell FC managers